The Waggoner Covered Bridge, also known as the Roddy's Mill Covered Bridge, was a historic wooden covered bridge located at Northeast Madison Township and Tyrone Township in Perry County, Pennsylvania. It was a  Burr Truss bridge, constructed about 1889.  It crossed Bixler's Run. Its WGCB reference is 38-50-15.

It was listed on the National Register of Historic Places in 1980.

On October 21, 2021 the bridge was destroyed in a fire.

References 

Covered bridges on the National Register of Historic Places in Pennsylvania
Covered bridges in Perry County, Pennsylvania
Bridges completed in 1889
Wooden bridges in Pennsylvania
Bridges in Perry County, Pennsylvania
Tourist attractions in Perry County, Pennsylvania
National Register of Historic Places in Perry County, Pennsylvania
Road bridges on the National Register of Historic Places in Pennsylvania
Burr Truss bridges in the United States